The 2007 Nigerian Senate election in Ebonyi State was held on 21 April 2007, to elect members of the Nigerian Senate to represent Ebonyi State. Julius Ucha representing Ebonyi Central, Anyimchukwu Ude representing Ebonyi South and Anthony Agbo representing Ebonyi North all won on the platform of the People's Democratic Party.

Overview

Summary

Results

Ebonyi Central 
The election was won by Julius Ucha of the Peoples Democratic Party (Nigeria).

Ebonyi South 
The election was won by Anyimchukwu Ude of the Peoples Democratic Party (Nigeria).

Ebonyi North
The election was won by Anthony Agbo of the Peoples Democratic Party (Nigeria).

References 

April 2007 events in Nigeria
Ebonyi State Senate elections
Ebo